Eduard Valentinovich Troyanovsky (born 30 May 1980) is a Russian professional boxer who held the IBF and IBO light-welterweight titles from 2015 to 2016.

Professional career

Troyanovsky vs. Zwarg 
Troyanovsky made his professional debut on 28 November 2009, winning a four-round points decision over Richard Zwarg. 

Fighting in Germany and Russia for the next six years, Troyanovsky won 19 fights in a row, most of them by knockout.

Troyanovsky vs. Shakhanzaryan 
On 10 April 2015, he knocked out Aik Shakhnazaryan in eight rounds to win the vacant IBO light-welterweight title.

Troyanovsky vs. Cuenca I & II 
Later that year, on 4 November 2015, Troyanovsky won the IBF light-welterweight title by stopping César Cuenca in the sixth round. He successfully defended both titles in a rematch against Cuenca on 8 April 2016, this time stopping him in seven rounds.

Troyanovsky vs. Obara 
A second defence of the titles came in spectacular style on 9 September 2016, which saw Troyanovsky launch Keita Obara through the ring ropes in round two, and ultimately finish the fight with further unanswered punches when Obara climbed back in to resume.

Troyanovsky vs. Indongo 
On 3 December 2016, Troyanovsky suffered his first career loss in a major upset, after Julius Indongo knocked him out cold in the first round.

Troyanovsky vs. Relikh 
On october 7, 2018, Troyanovsky fought Kiryl Relikh for the WBA super lightweight title. Relikh defeated Troyanovsky by a slight margin, winning 115-113 on all three scorecards.

Troyanovsky vs. Zahradnik 
In his next bout, Troyanovsky secured a wide unanimous decision win against a durable Josef Zahradnik, 100-90, 99-91 and 98-92 on the scorecards.

Professional boxing record

References

External links

Eduard Troyanovsky - Profile, News Archive & Current Rankings at Box.Live

Russian male boxers
1980 births
Sportspeople from Omsk
Living people
International Boxing Federation champions
Light-welterweight boxers
International Boxing Organization champions
Lightweight boxers
World light-welterweight boxing champions